India Trade Promotion Organisation (ITPO), headquartered at Pragati Maidan, is the nodal agency of the Government of India under aegis of Ministry of Commerce and Industry (India) for promoting country's external trade. ITPO is a Mini-Ratna Category-1 Central Public Sector Enterprise (CPSE) with 100 percent shareholding of Government of India.

In January 2016, ITPO appointed NBCC as Project Management Consultant (PMC) for Integrated Exhibition-cum-Convention Centre (IECC) project as part of Redevelopment of Pragati Maidan. The project garnered much media attention due to demolition of Hall of Nations and Nehru Pavilion by ITPO in April 2017, after approval from Delhi High Court. ITPO has awarded the IECC construction work to Shapoorji Pallonji Group for INR 2150 crores, making the project cost go over whopping INR 2600 crores.

On 22 December 2017, Vice-President of India Venkaiah Naidu laid foundation stone of IECC project and Integrated Transit Corridor Development project at Pragati Maidan.

Events of ITPO 

At Pragati Maidan, New Delhi
 Aajeevika (14–23 April 2017)
 Smart City India Expo (10–12 May 2017)
 India International Footwear Fair, New Delhi (4–6 August 2017)
 Delhi Book and Stationary Fair (26 August – 3 September 2017)
 India Wellness Expo (29–31 August 2017)
 Electricity India
 Telecom India
 India International Security Expo (October 2017)
 India International Trade Faie (14–27 November 2017)
 New Delhi World Book Fair (January/February 2018)
 Nakshatra (January/ February 2018)
 Tex Styles India (January/February 2018)
 Aahar- The International Food & Hospitality Fair (March 2018)

Other Cities in India
 Aahar – The Food & Hospitality Fair, Mumbai (11–14 October 2017)
 East Himalayan Expo, Gangtok (December 2017)
 India International Leather Fair, Chennai (1–3 February 2018)
 India International Leather Fair, Kolkata (February/March 2018)
 Tex Styles India, Kolkata (February/March 2018)

Outside India
 As proposed by ITPO board and approved by Govt. of India

Third Party Events

Many private companies, cooperatives and confederations organise prestigious fairs in Pragati Maidan such as
 Confederation of Indian Industries (CII)
 Federation of Indian Chambers of Commerce & Industry (FICCI)
 ABEC
 Pavilions & Interiors
 Inter Ads
 Exhibition India Group
 MEX Exhibitions
 Reed Manch Exhibitions
 International Trade and Exhibitions India
 UBM India
 Messe Frankfurt India
 Hannover Milano Fairs India

History 
India Trade Promotion Organisation (ITPO) was incorporated by merger of Trade Development Authority (TDA), a Registered Society under Ministry of Commerce & Industry, with Trade Fair Authority of India (TFAI) with effect from 1 January 1992. TFAI was earlier incorporated, under Section 25 of the Indian Companies Act, 1956, on 30 December 1976 by amalgamating 3 organisations of the Government of India viz. India International Trade Fair Organisation, Directorate of Exhibitions & Commercial Publicity and Indian Council of Trade Fairs & Exhibitions and commenced operations with effect from 1 March 1977.

ITPO, during its existence of more than 3 decades has played a proactive role in catalysing trade, investment and technology transfer processes. Its promotional tools include organising of fairs and exhibitions in India and abroad, Buyer-Seller Meets, Contact Promotion Programmes, Product Promotion Programmes, Promotion through Overseas Department Stores, Market Surveys and Information Dissemination.

Some of the structures in Pragati Maidan were designed by the best Architects of their times, like the following:
 Hall-6 (Hall of Nations), Hall 2-5 (Hall of Industries) and Nehru Pavilion were designed by iconic architect Raj Rewal along with architect Kuldip Singh in 1971–1972. They were demolished in 2017 to give way for Redevelopment of Pragati Maidan.
 Later on, Hall-14 (Hall of States) was designed by architect Raj Rewal in 1981–1982. This was also demolished in 2017 to give way for Redevelopment of Pragati Maidan.
 National Science Centre was designed by architect Achyut Kanvinde.
 Craft Museum was designed by architect Charles Correa.
 Hall-7 was designed by architect Rajinder Kumar.
 Hall-18 (Hall of Technology) was designed by eminent architectural firm Stein, Doshi & Bhalla Consultants. This was demolished in 2018 to give way for Redevelopment of Pragati Maidan.
 Phoolwari Convention Centre was designed by architect Jasbir Sachdev. This was demolished in 2017 to give way for Redevelopment of Pragati Maidan.
 Shakuntalam Theatre was designed by architect Ranjit Sabikhi. This was demolished in 2017 to give way for Redevelopment of Pragati Maidan.
 Erstwhile Hindustan Lever Pavilion (1961) was designed by architect Charles Correa.
 Erstwhile DCM pavilion (1972) was designed by architect Jasbir Sawhney.
 Erstwhile Ford Pavilion (1996) was designed by architect Sanjay Wadhwa.

Sphere of Activities 
ITPO has been managing the Pragati Maidan exhibition complex in New Delhi, which is spread over an area of 123.5 acres and has established it as a renowned destination for holding exhibitions, conventions, seminars, business meets and other trade promotion activities. The existing infrastructure of Pragati Maidan includes more than 16 exhibitions halls of about 65,000 sq.m. out of which 40,000 sq.m. is air-conditioned space. It also consists of additional open space of 32,000 sq.m., a modern air conditioned food plaza with seating capacity for 500 plus persons, open and covered auditoriums with a combined capacity for 5500 and 1000 persons respectively, lounge areas, business centre facilities, etc.  The existing facilities are being used by Industry, various Ministries, Govt. Departments and State Governments to present their policies, initiatives and achievements by supporting/holding exhibitions, conventions and other trade related events.

ITPO has an extensive infrastructure as well as marketing and information facilities that are availed by both exporters and importers. ITPO had had overseas offices at New York City, Frankfurt, Tokyo, Moscow and São Paulo for pursuing opportunities for enhancement of India's trade and investment. However, all overseas offices are now closed by ITPO.

ITPO has four Regional Offices:
 Chennai
 Kolkata
 Mumbai

The Regional Offices, through their respective profile of activities, ensure a concerted and well coordinated trade promotion drive throughout the country.

Subsidiaries 
ITPO has two subsidiaries namely Tamil Nadu Trade Promotion Organisation (TNTPO) and Karnataka Trade Promotion Organisation (KTPO) with share holding of 51 percent in each of them. With the commissioning of the state-of-the-art Chennai Trade Centre (CTC) in January 2001 and the Trade Centre Bangalore in September 2004, ITPO has successfully completed the first phase of the setting-up of modern exhibition facilities outside Delhi.

In FY 2015–2016, TNTPO and KTPO registered revenues of about INR 315 million and INR 48 million respectively and have reserves of about INR 1840 million and INR 390 million respectively.

The Chennai Trade Centre, which is now spread across 14,000 sqm, is planned to be expanded by addition of 6,000 sqm and ITPO is seeking approval from the board of the TNTPO for the same.

In 1995, ITPO launched 50:50 Joint subsidiary with National Informatics Centre (NIC) in the form of National Centre for Trade Information (NCTI), for collection and dissemination of trade data and improving Business Information Services to the business community, especially SME. In 2015–2016, NCTI registered operational loss of about INR 2 million and net negative assets of about INR 4 million.

ITPO had coordinated the construction of exhibition-cum-trade complex Maniram Dewan Trade Centre (Guwahati) for Assam Trade Promotion Organisation under 'Assistance to States for Developing Export Infrastructure and Allied Activities (ASIDE) Scheme, for facilitating trade in North-Eastern States.

International Trade and Convention Centre (Kerala) is proposed joint venture project of Indian Trade Promotion Organisation (ITPO) and Kerala Industrial Infrastructure Development Corporation (Kinfra) at 25 acres of land in the Kinfra Export Promotion Industrial Park in Kakkanad. The project would require investment of Rs. 1125 million, of which 31.25 crore each will be provided by the central and state governments and the remaining Rs 50 crore will be mobilised via credit. The state government granted an in-principle approval for the project in 2012, but owing to the non-availability of funds it got delayed.

Strategic Issues 
ITPO is operating a trade portal Trade Portal of India having all trade related information including country profiles, product profiles, trade directory etc. ITPO is networking with International Organisation in the field of Trade and Commerce through membership or collaborative arrangements such as Memorandum of Understanding (MoU), ITPO is a founder member of Asian Trade Promotion Forum (ATPF) and participates in its Annual meets regularly.

Central Industrial Security Force (CISF) provide round-the-clock security at Pragati Maidan. Access control to the exhibitions area would also be monitored by another team of the squad with help from private security guards.

ITPO signed MoU with Federation of Indian Chambers of Commerce & Industry (FICCI) to collaborate on trade promotion. ITPO also signed MoU with the Confederation of Indian Industry (CII) in April 2011, directed towards a collective and well-directed effort to promote India's trade identifying the internal strengths of the respective organisations.

ITPO signed MoU with National Book Trust (NBT), India for conducting New Delhi World Book Fair every year, starting from February 2013.

In 2013, ITPO has commissioned the Indian Institute of Management, Ahmedabad (IIM-A) to construct a Business Confidence Index and a Consumer Confidence Index using data from ITPO's exhibitions.

Karnataka Exhibition Authority (KEA) is in early discussions with ITPO to set up Pragati Haat in every district headquarters and one near Bangalore similar to that of Delhi's Pragati Maidan.  KEA has sought 20 acres of land in each district and 70 acres of land near Bangalore for the purpose.

As per Allocation of Business Rules (which describes distribution of subject amongst GoI's departments and ministries), ITPO's activities are now classified under Export Promotion, in place of the previous classification under State Trading.

Commerce & Industry Minister Nirmala Sitharaman endorsed in September 2015 that ITPO is one of India's best agencies for international affairs and is on the verge of starting a major Convention Centre in Delhi as the capital does not have a venue where international conferences could be held.

Financials 

ITPO has been upgraded to Mini-Ratna Category-1 by Department of Public Enterprises (DPE) in 2015 due to continuous profit and robust past performance. This shall empower ITPO to incur capital expenditure on new projects, modernisation, purchase of equipment etc., without Government approval up to Rs. 500 crores, which was Rs. 250 crores under Mini-Ratna Category-II. ITPO is registered under Section-8 of the Companies Act, 2013 and so does not declare any dividend.

ITPO's cash surplus stands at more than Rs. 18.4 billion in FY2015-16, making it one of the most cash-rich CPSE. As a result of robust performance in both financial and non- financial parameters, ITPO has achieved MoU excellent rating consecutively for the last four years between 2011 and 2015.

ITPO continued performing handsomely and registered total income of about Rs. 3890 million and Net profit stood at about Rs. 2630 million in FY 2016–2017, a jump of about 60 percent over previous year's profit of about Rs. 1650 million.

In the MoU signed by ITPO with Department of Commerce for FY 2017–2018, financial target for Revenue from Operations has been fixed at Rs. 2280 million and Net Surplus at Rs. 160 million.

Logo 
ITPO logo was designed for the erstwhile TFAI by eminent graphic designer Benoy Sarkar in 1974. He is also credited for designing iconic logos of Indian Airlines, Airports Authority of India, Delhi Transport Corporation, etc.

ITPO logo has an interesting depiction of letters T (Trade) and F (Fair). The tone is a fusion of preservation of traditions of Trade and Investments along with modern identity of ITPO. The logo has a universal form. It signifies an authority of India exercising trade through fairs and exhibitions in India and abroad. The emblem has been derived from an inscription on a gold coin belonging to the era of the ancient ruler, Samundragupta (circa 330-380 A.D.) symbolising the zenith achieved in external trade. The vertical and horizontal strokes in the symbol represent life and prosperity.

Pictures of Halls & Events of ITPO

See also 
 List of public sector undertakings in India

References

1977 establishments in Delhi
Government agencies established in 1977
Companies based in New Delhi
Foreign trade of India
Government agencies of India
Service companies of India
Marketing in India